Harry Wilson  was a Scottish footballer who played for Partick Thistle, mainly as a left half. He featured prominently for the Jags for six seasons after joining in 1903, making 161 appearances in all competitions including the Glasgow Merchants Charity Cup final of 1905, before joining Vale of Leven in 1909. Some sources suggest he was selected for the Scottish Football League XI, but the player involved was Robert Wilson who joined Partick almost at the same time Harry departed.

References

Year of birth unknown
Year of death unknown
20th-century deaths
Scottish footballers
Association football wing halves
Scottish Junior Football Association players
Petershill F.C. players
Partick Thistle F.C. players
Vale of Leven F.C. players
Scottish Football League players